Catío Emberá (Catío, Katío) is an indigenous American language spoken by the Embera people of Colombia and Panama.

The language was spoken by 15,000 people in Colombia, and a few dozen in Panama, according to data published in 1992. 90 to 95% of the speakers are monolingual with a 1% literacy rate. The language is also known as Eyabida, and like most Embera languages goes by the name Embena 'human'.

Writing system 
Catio is written with the Latin script.

Phonology

Consonants

Vowels

Notes

Bibliography
 

Choco languages
Languages of Colombia